Matecumbe (2007) is a novel by American author James A. Michener, published unfinished, posthumously.

Set in Florida, Matecumbe is a small, character-driven story detailing the relationship of a mother and daughter, both divorced and living parallel lives. The book was abandoned by Michener when Random House urged for more of his larger, epic-scope novels. It was published during the 10th anniversary year after his death (and the 100th anniversary year of his birth) in its unpolished state.

References

2007 American novels
Novels by James A. Michener
Novels published posthumously
Novels set in Florida
Florida Keys
Unfinished novels
University Press of Florida books